Priapichthys annectens is a species of freshwater fish. It is a member of the family Poeciliidae of order Cyprinodontiformes. It is the type species of the genus Priapichthys (though first described as Gambusia annectens). It is native to Costa Rica, primarily inhabiting brooks and streams with currents of low to high velocity. A carnivorous surface feeder, it occurs in shoals near the shoreline.

This species has the terminal, upward-facing mouth typical of surface feeders, and a protruding belly. It is of plain coloration with 6–12 dark vertical bars along its sides, and the intensity of the bars varies according to the geographical region of different populations. Males reach a maximum overall length around 4 cm, with females reaching about 6.5 cm.

References

 Original description: Regan, 1907: Descriptions of six new freshwater fishes from Mexico and Central America. Annals and Magazine of Natural History: Series 7, 19(111): 258–260
 
 

Poeciliidae
Priapichthys annectens
Fish of Costa Rica
Freshwater fish of Central America
Live-bearing fish
Ovoviviparous fish
Fish described in 1907